

Background 
The Tamale Interchange is a road interchange project within the Tamale Metropolis of the Northern Region of Ghana. The first of it kind in the northern sector of the country.

Its construction was initiated on April 10, 2019 when the president of the Republic of Ghana, Nana Addo Dankwa Akuffo Addo, launched and also cut the sod for its construction to begin.
The interchange is aimed at enhancing inter-urban and national traffic flow and reducing the huge burden and cost of doing business, and also strengthening trade within the Sub Saharan regions.

Structure 
The structure is a pre-stressed concrete bridge spanning a distance of some 1.1 kilometres

Funding 
This project was funded under the US$2 billion China Syno-hydro deal. The Government of Ghana signed a Master Project Support Agreement (MPSA) for the delivery worth of priority infrastructure projects across the country, in exchange for the delivery of Ghanaian manufactured aluminium products to Sinohydro.

References

Road interchanges in Ghana
Roads in Ghana